Blackout is a supervillain appearing in American comic books published by Marvel Comics. He is depicted as a half-demon, and is the second character to use the name.

A character named after Blackout is portrayed by Johnny Whitworth in the 2011 film Ghost Rider: Spirit of Vengeance.

Publication history

Blackout first appeared in Ghost Rider #2 in June 1990 and was created by Howard Mackie and Javier Saltares. He would continue to appear intermittently throughout Ghost Rider Vol 3 (published from 1990 to 1998) as well as other comics like New Avengers Vol 1 and Deadpool: Assassins Vol 1.

Fictional character biography

Battling Ghost Rider
Blackout was a darkness-generating superhuman and professional criminal who first appeared in Ghost Rider #2 (1990). He has the ability to automatically generate a light-dampening field which negates all visible light in a significant area. His albinoesque complexion and extreme physical sensitivity to sunlight and light in general likely accounts for this power manifestation, and its vampiric similarities apparently led him to have his teeth and fingernails replaced with mechanically enhanced metal ones.

Blackout was initially employed by the demonic crime lord Deathwatch as an enforcer and assassin. Deathwatch ordered Blackout to search for bio-toxin canisters stolen by a youth gang named the Cypress Hill Jokers under their leader Paulie Stratton. Blackout murdered detective Frank Loretti and his family, as well as Ralph D'Amato's parents before battling the Ghost Rider (Dan Ketch) for the first time. Deathwatch and Blackout then attacked the NYPD's 75th Precinct police station, murdered several police officers, stole the bio-toxin canisters, and abducted Paulie and the Cypress Hill Jokers. Subsequently, Blackout battled the Kingpin's men as well as Ghost Rider again. Blackout was disfigured in the battle when he was scorched by hellfire by trying to bite through Ghost Rider's jacket. This caused him to become Ghost Rider's sworn arch-enemy. Blackout learned Ghost Rider's identity as Dan Ketch, and murdered his comatose sister Barbara Ketch in revenge. Blackout then killed Ketch's acquaintances, newspaper vendor Theodore Larsen and Father Michael McDonald.

Blackout continued to stalk Ghost Rider. He encountered HEART, and menaced some human children protected by the Morlock Pixie (not to be confused with the X-Men character of the same name), who had been in conflict with Masque over a plan to change babies into mutated forms. Ghost Rider's incorrect belief it was Blackout behind the vanishing of babies brings the attention of the real Blackout. Though the children are rescued safely, with the assistance of X-Factor, Blackout manages to kill Pixie and escape after battling Ghost Rider again.

Blackout murdered several sewer workers, then battled Ghost Rider, John Blaze and HEART again; during this battle, his face is further disfigured by Blaze's gun, and Blackout was finally captured by the police. He was freed from prison by the Firm, then abducted Ketch's mother and friends, seemingly murdering Dan Ketch by tearing his throat out while he is in human form. Only supernatural intervention from other sources allows Dan to recover while the Ghost Rider exists as a separate entity. Around this time, Blackout went on a murderous rampage through Central Park, leading to a hostage situation with the police. Along with Mr. Stern, Blackout is captured by Ghost Rider and sealed in a mausoleum.

With Mr. Stern, Blackout escapes the mausoleum. Blackout experiences a vision of Lilith, the demon-goddess who claimed she was his grandmother. Blackout joins forces with Lilith and the Lilin, and would team up with many superpowered offspring of Lilith, all doing her will. Blackout, Creed, and Pilgrim abducted John Blaze's son, then battles Blaze and Ghost Rider. Alongside Lilth and the Lilin, Blackout battles Ghost Rider, John Blaze, Dr. Michael Morbius, the Nightstalkers, and the Darkhold Redeemers in Greenland. Blade impales Blackout through the eye, killing him. Blackout is later reborn along with the rest of his fallen brethren, thanks to Lilith. He has a fresh new face, but it is later burned in battle with Ghost Rider.

During one of his many times working with Lilith, he re-inspires the police officer Badilino into becoming Vengeance again. Wracked with doubt after learning his demonic mission means little, Badilino is frozen with indecision as Lilith's forces, Blackout, Dark Legion and Meatmarket attack his precinct. Seeing Blackout threaten to consume a small child, Badilino transforms and literally leaps into action. The child is saved. Blackout takes an opportunity minutes later to attack Dan Ketch's friend Stacy Dolan. She is saved by Ghost Rider. Blackout and the Lilin are distracted by the arrival of Doctor Strange and other Midnight Sons, who are their primary objective. A spell, cast as the Sons retreat from overwhelming forces, protects the citizens in the precinct from being seen by Lilin.

After being defeated by the Midnight Sons, Blackout had his face deformities repaired and went back to work as a hired assassin, also eliminating a few personal grudges along the way. He becomes romantically obsessed with Wei, a female reporter who was once affiliated with Deathwatch and has figured out Ghost Rider's secret identity. His murderous torment of Wei causes her to snap and attempt suicide live on camera, but Blackout kills her before she can pull the trigger. He is captured by Ghost Rider and chained over the World Trade Center where he is thought to have burned to death.

New Avengers
Much later, Blackout was seen among the escaping villains in the prison breakout in New Avengers #1, and his sudden lack-of-death is later explained in the New Avengers: Most Wanted Files, where it is revealed, he was arrested before burning to death.

Blackout was hired by the Hood to take advantage of the split in the superhero community caused by the Superhuman Registration Act. He helped them fight the New Avengers but was taken down by Doctor Strange.

Secret Invasion
In Secret Invasion, he is one among many supervillains who rejoined the Hood's crime syndicate and attacked an invading Skrull force.

Death of Caretaker
Blackout is later seen aiding Danny Ketch's attack and killing Caretaker before facing off against Ghost Rider.

He joins with the Hood's gang in an attack on the New Avengers, who were expecting the Dark Avengers instead.

Blackout was recruited by Zadikiel to assemble a "task-force" of Ghost Rider foes to hunt down and destroy both the Ketch & Blaze Ghost Riders. Later, he attacked the church filled with the gun armed nuns, alongside Orb, Deacon and the new Vengeance. He cloaks the place in darkness threatening and mocking the nuns, but is stopped by being shot with bullets that were covered in holy water. Blackout runs away screaming in pain into the night.

Siege
Blackout was seen during the Siege of Asgard as part of the Hood crime syndicate.

Fear Itself
During the Fear Itself storyline, Blackout and Deathwatch assist Sin (in the form of Skadi) in attacking Dayton, Ohio. Since Johnny Blaze is no longer Ghost Rider, a man named Adam performs a ritual in a pyramid in Nicaragua in which one of his followers, a woman named Alejandra, becomes the new female Ghost Rider who is able to defeat Deathwatch and Blackout II.

He reappears as one of the villains summoned by Sin to battle Earth's heroes.

In The Superior Spider-Man
In an attempt to rebuild his reputation, Blackout goes after Superior Spider-Man (Doctor Octopus' mind in Peter Parker's body). He kidnaps Peter Parker's Aunt May, and holds her hostage, demanding that Parker, as Spider-Man's "tech designer", hand himself over in exchange. Superior Spider-Man tracks him down and they fight. Blackout gains the advantage and tries to bite out Spider-Man's neck. Unfortunately for Blackout, Superior Spider-Man was wearing a metal neck cover under his costume, which electrocuted him. Superior Spider-Man then tortured Blackout, ripping out his claws and teeth. In agony, Blackout begs for mercy, promising never to go after anyone Superior Spider-Man knows again. Superior Spider-Man tells him to spread the word to all the other criminals that "Peter Parker is off limits", then exposes Blackout to artificial sunlight, burning him.

Powers and abilities
Blackout's demonic heritage endows him with supernatural powers of enhanced strength, resilience to injuries, and heightened reflexes which enable him to challenge both Ghost Rider and other superhumans. His eyesight is particularly sensitive even in total darkness which gives him superior night vision but can be exploited to temporarily blind him. His core ability allows him to immediately extinguish any source of light - be it natural or artificial - in his immediate vicinity; cloaking the affected area in an unnatural veil of darkness which acts as a sensory-deprivation field to anyone other than Blackout himself who gets caught within it.

As a possible drawback due to the shadow-rooted nature of his abilities, Blackout's skin is extremely photosensitive. Exposure to harsh artificial sources can cause irritation, while exposure to direct sunlight or ultraviolet light results in severe burns and blisters. Prolonged exposure can prove potentially fatal. He also makes an effort to avoid large bodies of fire for the same reasons and lives an almost entirely nocturnal lifestyle. In addition to his demonic attributes, Blackout has had his canine teeth and fingernails replaced with razor-sharp mechanical prosthetics capable of easily rending through flesh and bone similar to a vampire.

Beyond his gifts and augmentations, Blackout is highly experienced as a hand-to-hand combatant; able to take on opponents easily equal to him in strength and potentially win. As he has no formal martial training, Blackout's fighting techniques are more akin to a street wrestler than a soldier or professional fighter. Only a super-humanly strong fighter with superior martial skills and experience could potentially defeat him. Blackout's physical gifts also lend well to acrobatics; allowing him to traverse most environments and evade slow enemy attacks with superhuman agility and speed, though he can still be caught off-guard.

In other media
 Blackout appears in the Ghost Rider film tie-in game, voiced by Lex Lang.
 A character loosely inspired by Blackout named Ray Carrigan appears in Ghost Rider: Spirit of Vengeance, portrayed by Johnny Whitworth. In creating Carrigan, the production team chose to base his characterization solely on the comic book incarnation's appearance and not his history in Marvel Comics. Additionally, Whitworth stated that he plays "the villain who, at the beginning, up until like page 70, is human, [...] I'm not a very nice guy. I'm bad. I get turned into, for those who read 'Ghost Rider', the character Blackout. I get turned into him by the devil to complete my job. That gives me the fortitude to fight Ghost Rider and the supernatural abilities to compete on some level with that guy." Carrigan is a mercenary, drug dealer, and gun runner who is hired by Roarke to kidnap the former's ex-girlfriend Nadya's son Danny who Roarke fathered with her. This brings Carrigan into conflict with the Ghost Rider, who defeats and leaves him for dead. Roarke later finds Carrigan and empowers him with the ability to decay anything he touches and darkness manipulation so he can finish the job. Blackout is eventually killed by the Ghost Rider.

References

External links
 

Characters created by Howard Mackie
Comics characters introduced in 1990
Fictional mercenaries in comics
Fictional murderers
Fictional characters with albinism
Fictional characters with disfigurements
Fictional characters with superhuman durability or invulnerability
Fictional characters with superhuman senses
Fictional half-demons
Marvel Comics characters who can move at superhuman speeds
Marvel Comics characters with superhuman strength
Marvel Comics demons
Marvel Comics hybrids
Marvel Comics film characters
Marvel Comics supervillains